is a Japanese manga artist. She made her debut in 1992 at the age of 17 in Bessatsu Margaret with "Koi nante nai."

List of works 
  (1997, Shueisha)
  (1998, Shueisha)
  (1999, Shueisha); English translation: The Devil Does Exist (2005, CMX Manga)
  (2003, Shueisha); English translation: Crimson Hero (2005, Viz Media)

References

External links 
 

Manga artists
Women manga artists
Living people
Japanese women artists
Japanese female comics artists
Female comics writers
20th-century Japanese women writers
21st-century Japanese women writers
Year of birth missing (living people)